Mezzeh Military Airport (also spelled Mazzeh) is a Syrian Air Force military air base located in Mezzeh, Damascus, Syria, south-west of the old centre of Damascus. It has one runway of 8258 ft length, at elevation 2407 ft. In mid-2013 the airport was described by the BBC as "an important strategic installation [which] plays a significant role in distributing the government's military supplies." Reuters reported in mid-2013 that it was "used by Syria's elite Republican Guards, Special Forces and Air Force Intelligence, [and] also serves as a private airport for the Assad family." It also said that during the Syrian civil war the base was "used to fire rockets and artillery at rebellious Sunni Muslim neighbourhoods on the edge of the capital."
The location of the Mezzeh military airport has also been used by the Syrian regime as a jail to imprison opponents during the Syrian civil war. Various inquiries and investigations reported that acts of tortures and possible war crimes were committed in the jails of Mezzeh military airport.

History
During World War II Mazzeh airport was a military base for the Vichy French airforce, which also permitted Germany to use its bases. On 19 May 1941, British aircraft attacked the airport, destroying some modern Potez 63 aircraft as well some older Potez 25 biplanes.

After Syrian independence in 1946, Mazzeh became a base for the Syrian Air Force. "By the end of 1957 the SAF had two operational MiG-17 squadrons defending the capital from their base at al-Mezze near Damascus." In 1966 it became also the Defense Companies Headquarter.

The airport was subject to an attack that was blamed on Israel by Syrian authorities on January 13, 2017.

See also
 List of Syrian Air Force bases

References

Syrian Air Force bases